Give Me Danger is Dangerous Muse's second EP and last release through Cordless Recordings. The EP was not released as a physical product but as a digital download. The EP has been released twice. On August 22nd, it was released as a three song EP featuring all new Dangerous Muse songs. Then on October 3rd, The EP was released and combined with the songs from The Rejection EP.

Track listing
August 22, 2006 Release
 "Give Me Danger" - 4:01
 "Break Up"- 3:25
 "In This Town" - 4:02
October 3, 2006 Release
 "Give Me Danger" - 4:01
 "In This Town" - 4:02
 "The Rejection" - 3:56
 "All Yours (The Doctor)" - 3:16
 "Break Up"- 3:25
 "Apart" - 4:10

External links

 The official Dangerous Muse site

2006 EPs
Dangerous Muse albums